Percy LeBaron Spencer (July 19, 1894 – September 8, 1970) was an American physicist and inventor. He became known as the inventor of the microwave oven.

Early life

Spencer was born in Howland, Maine. Eighteen months later, Spencer's father died, and his mother soon left him in the care of his aunt and uncle. His uncle then died when Spencer was just seven years old. Spencer subsequently left grammar school to earn money to support himself and his aunt. From the ages of twelve to sixteen, he worked from sunrise to sunset at a spool mill. At the later age, he discovered that a local paper mill was soon to begin using electricity, a concept little known in his rural home region, and he began learning as much as possible about the phenomenon. When he applied to work at the mill, he was one of three people hired to install electricity in the plant, despite never having received any formal training in electrical engineering or even finishing grammar school.

At the age of 18, Spencer decided to join the U.S. Navy. He had become interested in Wireless communications after learning about the wireless operators aboard the Titanic when it sank. While he was with the navy, he made himself an expert on radio technology: "I just got hold of a lot of textbooks and taught myself while I was standing watch at night." He also subsequently taught himself trigonometry, calculus, chemistry, physics, and metallurgy, among other subjects.

Career
By 1939 Spencer became one of the world's leading experts in radar tube design. Spencer worked at Raytheon, a contractor for the U.S. Department of Defense, as the chief of the power tube division. While working at Raytheon, Spencer developed a more efficient way to manufacture magnetrons, increasing production from 100 to 2600 magnetrons per day. With his reputation and expertise, Spencer managed to help Raytheon win a government contract to develop and produce combat radar equipment for M.I.T.’s Radiation Laboratory. This was of huge importance to the Allies of World War II and became the military's second-highest priority project during World War II, behind the Manhattan Project. For his work, he was awarded the Distinguished Public Service Award by the U.S. Navy.

One day while building magnetrons, Spencer was standing in front of an active radar set when he noticed the candy bar he had in his pocket melted. Spencer was not the first to notice this phenomenon, but he was the first to investigate it. He decided to experiment using food, including popcorn kernels, which became the world's first microwaved popcorn. In another experiment, an egg was placed in a tea kettle, and the magnetron was placed directly above it. The result was the egg exploding in the face of one of his co-workers, who was looking in the kettle to observe. Spencer then created the first true microwave oven by attaching a high-density electromagnetic field generator to an enclosed metal box. The magnetron emitted microwaves into the metal box blocking any escape and allowing for controlled and safe experimentation. He then placed various food items in the box, while observing the effects and monitoring temperatures.

Raytheon filed a U.S. patent on October 8, 1945, for a microwave cooking oven, eventually named the Radarange. In 1947, the first commercially produced microwave oven was about 6 feet tall, weighed about 750 lbs, and cost about $5,000. In 1967 the first relatively affordable, $495, and reasonably sized (counter-top) microwave oven was available for sale, produced by Amana (a division of Raytheon).

Spencer became Senior Vice President and a Senior Member of the Board of Directors at Raytheon. He received 300 patents during his career. Originally, a Raytheon facility in Burlington, Massachusetts involved in vacuum tube development and manufacturing was named Spencer Labs after Spencer. This facility was eventually closed. Later, a new building at the Raytheon Missile Defense Center in Woburn, Massachusetts, was named in his honor. Other achievements and awards, besides the Distinguished Public Service Award, included membership of the Institute of Radio Engineers, Fellowship in the American Academy of Arts and Sciences, and an Honorary Doctor of Science from the University of Massachusetts, despite having no formal education.

For his invention, Spencer received no royalties, but he was paid a one-time $2.00 gratuity from Raytheon, the same token payment the company made to all inventors on its payroll at that time for company patents.

Personal life
Spencer and his wife, Louise, had three children: John, James, and George. He counted Vannevar Bush, Omar Bradley, William Redington Hewlett and David Packard as friends. Later, he was married to Lillian Ottenheimer on November 18, 1960.

Legacy
Raytheon Integrated Defense Systems, which deals extensively in radar systems, has named a building after Spencer in the Woburn, Massachusetts facility. An early Radarange model sits in the lobby, across from the dining center.

References

External links 
 "Gramps - How an orphan from Maine became the Edison of the modern age" by Rod Spencer
 Inventor's Stories: Percy Spencer
 Percy L. Spencer - The National Inventors Hall of Fame
Who Invented Microwaves?
 "Percy Spencer and His Itch to Know" by Don Murray, Reader's Digest, August 1958

1894 births
1970 deaths
20th-century American engineers
People from Penobscot County, Maine
Raytheon Company people
Recipients of the Navy Distinguished Public Service Award
20th-century American inventors